Kamron Habibullah (born October 23, 2003) is a Canadian professional soccer player who plays as a forward for Vancouver Whitecaps FC. Born in Uzbekistan, he has represented Canada at the under-17 and under-20 level.

Early life
Habibullah was born in Tashkent, Uzbekistan to Afghan Uzbek parents and emigrated to British Columbia, Canada with his family at the age of two. He played youth soccer at age seven with South Burnaby Metro SC, and later played with Burnaby Selects, and Mountain United FC. He joined the Whitecaps academy system in 2016 at the age of 12. He went on to score 21 goals in 58 appearances from U-16 to U-19, netting four goals at the 2019 Generation Adidas Cup and scoring the winning goal against Real Madrid Academy.

Club career
After spending the duration of the preseason with the first team, it was announced on April 23, 2021, that Vancouver Whitecaps FC would be signing Habibullah to a multi-year MLS homegrown contract. He made his first team debut the following week, replacing Caio Alexandre in the 88th minute of a 1–0 loss to the Colorado Rapids.

On March 11, 2022, Habibullah went on loan with Canadian Premier League side Pacific FC. He made his debut in Pacific's season-opener against Forge FC on April 10.

International career
His parents' Afghan link and his Uzbek ancestry, himself belonging to the Uzbek Afghan minority, means Kamron is available to play for either Canada, Afghanistan and Uzbekistan.

Habibullah was first called up to a Canada U17 national camp in March 2019 by head coach Andrew Olivieri, in preparation for the 2019 FIFA U-17 World Cup. He went on to score three goals in qualifying and appeared three times for Canada at the U-17 World Cup finals.

In April 2022, Habibullah was called up to the Canadian Under-20 side for two friendly matches against Costa Rica. He scored a goal in the first friendly on April 15. In June 2022, he was officially called up by the Canadian U-20 team for the 2022 CONCACAF U-20 Championship.

Career statistics

References

2003 births
Living people
Sportspeople of Afghan descent
Canadian people of Afghan descent
Canadian people of Uzbekistani descent
Uzbekistani people of Afghan descent
Uzbekistani emigrants to Canada
Sportspeople from Tashkent
Canadian soccer players
Uzbekistani footballers
Association football forwards
Canada men's youth international soccer players
Vancouver Whitecaps FC players
Homegrown Players (MLS)
Pacific FC players
Major League Soccer players
Canadian Premier League players